The single version of Wonderman is a pop song about Sonic the Hedgehog by English band Right Said Fred.  It was the third and final single from their second studio album, Sex and Travel.

The single differs significantly from the album version, having been re-worked for use by Sega Europe to promote the release of Sonic the Hedgehog 3.  Its lyrics and accompanying music video contain numerous explicit references to the video game, ending with a woman commenting, "He's just a flippin' hedgehog, okay?"  Actor Steven O'Donnell, at that time the advertising face of Sega Europe, also features prominently in the music video.

Wonderman was a minor hit on the UK Singles Chart, peaking at number 55.  It was featured on the compilation album Now 27, making it one of the lowest charting songs to appear on a Now album.

Track listing
UK CD single

 "Wonderman" (7" version)
 "Wonderman" (12" edit)
 "Wonderman" (Acapella)
 "Wonderman" (12" backing track, unedited)
 "Wonderman" (7" alternative lead vocal)

In popular culture

 "Wonderman" was featured in the 1994 Disney film Blank Check.

Chart positions

References

1994 singles
Right Said Fred songs
EMI Records singles
1993 songs
Songs written by Richard Fairbrass
Songs written by Fred Fairbrass
Songs written by Rob Manzoli